Zaharija Pribislavljević or Zaharija of Serbia (890s – 924) was Prince of the Serbs from 922 to 924. He defeated his cousin Pavle in 922. Zaharija was the son of Pribislav, the eldest son of Mutimir (r. 851–891) of the first Serbian dynasty (ruling since the early 7th century).

Life

Early
His father, Pribislav, ruled Serbia from 891 to 892 until his nephew, Petar, the son of Gojnik, returned from exile and defeated him in battle, ruling Serbia from 892 to 917. Pribislav fled to Croatia with his brothers Bran and Stefan. Bran later returned and led an unsuccessful rebellion against Petar in 894. Bran was defeated, captured and blinded (blinding was a Byzantine tradition meant to disqualify a person from taking the throne). Pribislav lived in Constantinople.

The Byzantine–Bulgarian Wars made the First Bulgarian Empire de facto the most powerful Empire of Southeastern Europe. The Bulgarians won after invading at the right time; they met little resistance in the north because of the Byzantines fighting the Arabs in Anatolia but eventually the Byzantines concluded peace with the Arabs. They sent their whole army against the Bulgarians but were decisively defeated in the battle of Achelous in 917. After several more victories Simeon I of Bulgaria prevailed. Petar switched sides to the Byzantines and was deposed and sent to Bulgaria; Pavle Branović was instated by the Bulgarians in 917, ruling until 920–921.

Rule

Zaharija was sent in 920 by Romanos I Lekapenos (r. 920–944) to retake the throne (as the rightful prince) but was captured by Pavle and sent to Symeon in Bulgaria. After this, the Byzantines sent envoys to Pavle, trying to make him a Byzantine ally; in the meantime, the Bulgarians tried to indoctrinate Zaharija. The Byzantines seem to have given much gold to Pavle in order to win him over, showing the danger a strong Bulgaria posed to Serbia. The Bulgarian troops were concentrated in Thrace, where Symeon besieged cities. In 921, Pavle was won over to the Byzantines, and he began to prepare an attack on Bulgaria. Symeon was interrupted during the campaign and was warned; he spared a few troops, sending them with Zaharija, and promising him the throne if he would defeat Pavle. The intervention was successful; Zaharija gained control of Serbia by spring 922. Once again, a Bulgarian ally was on the Serbian throne, but not for long.

Zaharija, who had long lived in Constantinople where he had been heavily influenced by the Byzantines, probably resented the Bulgarians after his capture, and was not truly won over. It was natural that the Serbs were pro-Byzantine and anti-Bulgarian; the Byzantines were distant and offered greater independence, while powerful Bulgaria interfered with its neighbour. Zaharija resumed his original alliance with the Byzantine Empire.

Zaharija started to unite several Slavic tribes along the common border to rebel against Bulgaria. In 923, Symeon sent an insufficient number of troops to quell the rebels; several Bulgarian generals were killed, and their heads and weapons were sent by Zaharija as gifts to the Byzantines. It was after Symeon tried and failed to ally himself with the Fatimids in a naval siege on Constantinople, and when he lost the battle against Zaharija, that he decided to meet with Romanus. In September 923, Symeon arrived at Constantinople, demanding a meeting with the Emperor. During the meeting Romanus managed to stir up Symeon, asking how the Bulgarian could live with so much blood on his hands. Peace was discussed, but Symeon left before any terms were signed or sworn. Presumably Symeon wanted keep the Greeks at peace so that he could tackle the problem posed by Zaharija.

In 924, a large Bulgarian army was sent into Serbia, led by Časlav, his second cousin. The army ravaged a good part of Serbia, forcing Zaharija to flee to Croatia. Zaharija probably led his soldiers into Croatia. Symeon summoned all the Serbian dukes to pay homage to their new prince, but, instead of instating Časlav, he took them all captive, and annexed Serbia. Bulgaria now considerably expanded its borders, neighbouring its ally Michael of Zahumlje and Croatia, where Zaharija was exiled. Croatia at this time had one of its most powerful leaders in history, Tomislav.

Časlav took the throne with Byzantine aid in 927, ruling Serbia until the 950s. No more is heard of Zaharija.

Notes

References

Sources

 
 
 
 
 Ćorović, Vladimir, Istorija srpskog naroda, Book I, (In Serbian) Electric Book, Rastko Electronic Book, Antikvarneknjige (Cyrillic)
 
 Ferjančić, B. 1997, "Basile I et la restauration du pouvoir byzantin au IXème siècle", Zbornik Radova Vizantološkog Instituta, no. 36, pp. 9–30.

External links
 Steven Runciman, A History of the First Bulgarian Empire, London 1930.

10th-century Serbian monarchs
10th-century rulers in Europe
Vlastimirović dynasty
Serbian exiles
890s births
924 deaths
Year of birth uncertain
Byzantine people of Slavic descent
People of the Bulgarian–Serbian Wars
Christian monarchs